Jessica Marcela Parra Rojas (born 10 August 1995) is a Colombian professional racing cyclist, who most recently rode for UCI Women's Continental Team .

Major results
2014
 3rd Team pursuit, Central American and Caribbean Games (with Valentina Paniagua, Milena Salcedo and Lorena Vargas)

See also
 List of 2015 UCI Women's Teams and riders

References

External links

1995 births
Living people
Colombian female cyclists
Sportspeople from Bogotá
Pan American Games medalists in cycling
Pan American Games bronze medalists for Colombia
Cyclists at the 2019 Pan American Games
Medalists at the 2019 Pan American Games
20th-century Colombian women
21st-century Colombian women
Competitors at the 2014 Central American and Caribbean Games
Competitors at the 2018 Central American and Caribbean Games
Competitors at the 2018 South American Games
South American Games gold medalists for Colombia
South American Games medalists in cycling